The Trio (also released as The Jazz Trio of Hank Jones) is an album by American jazz pianist Hank Jones recorded in 1955 for the Savoy label and released in 1956.

Reception

Allmusic awarded the album 4½ stars stating "This is a superb Hank Jones date; highly recommended for fans of piano trio music. In 1955, most jazz pianists were immersed in the school of Bud Powell. Jones is unique in that he developed his harmonic concept prior to Powell's ascendancy and the bebop revolution, but went on to fully assimilate the melodic vocabulary of bop. He has synthesized important elements from many great players into his own recognizable style. His versatility is evident on these eight selections".

Track listing
 "We're All Together" (Hank Jones) - 4:06
 "Odd Number" (Hank Jones) - 4:29
 "We Could Make Such Beautiful Music Together" (Henry Manners, Robert Sour) - 4:51
 "Now's the Time" (Charlie Parker) - 3:30
 "When Hearts Are Young" (Sigmund Romberg, Al Goodman) - 4:16
 "Cyrano" (Ozzie Cadena) - 5:17
 "Cyrano" [Alternate Take] (Cadena) - 5:19 Bonus track on reissue
 "There's a Small Hotel" (Richard Rodgers, Lorenz Hart) - 8:12
 "My Funny Valentine" (Rogers, Hart) - 5:52

Personnel 
Hank Jones - piano
Wendell Marshall - bass
Kenny Clarke - drums

References 

1956 albums
Hank Jones albums
Savoy Records albums
Albums produced by Ozzie Cadena
Albums recorded at Van Gelder Studio